Sergio de la Pava (born 1970/71) is an American novelist and lawyer. He is best known for his novel A Naked Singularity.

Biography 

Sergio de la Pava was born and raised in New Jersey, to parents who immigrated from Colombia. He attended Brooklyn Law School, where he met his wife. They live in New Jersey with their two children.

He works as a public defender in Manhattan, where he handles 70 to 80 cases at a time. He says of that work, "The stakes are a lot higher in that world than whether or not my book gets attention. On a given day, I have someone who really needs my help on a serious matter."

Career 

In 2008, De La Pava self-published his first novel, A Naked Singularity through XLibris. In October 2010, literary site The Quarterly Conversation ran a review by Scott Bryan Wilson that called the book "one of the best and most original novels of the decade" and "a towering, impressive work." That review caught the eye of staff at The University of Chicago Press, who signed the book up and published it in paperback in April 2012. The book was named one of the ten best works of fiction of 2012 by The Wall Street Journal. In the Chicago Tribune, Julia Keller wrote, "A Naked Singularity is not about physics. It's about the American criminal justice system in a large and chaotic city, a place slowly crushed by hopelessness in the same way that an ancient star is gradually crushed by gravity. . . . It is about a city that teeters on the edge of total collapse and complete disaster, but that has the capacity to right itself (whew!) at the last possible second." A Naked Singularity went on to win the PEN/Robert W. Bingham Prize from PEN as the best debut novel of that year. On February 10, 2014, it was named one of eight books on the shortlist for the inaugural Folio Prize for the best book published in the United Kingdom in 2013.

In April 2011, De La Pava self-published his second novel, Personae. The University of Chicago Press published a new paperback edition of that book in September 2013. In the Wall Street Journal, Sam Sacks wrote, "[I]n this willfully cryptic book, Mr. De La Pava's sense of moral urgency is ever-present. In only his early 40s, he is already a writer of mercurial brilliance, and even his strangest detours are worth following", and Bookforum called it " the most galvanizing meditation on the possibilities and ramifications of artistic process that I have read in recent memory."

Works

 Novels 
 2008: A Naked Singularity (Chicago: University of Chicago Press) 
 2011: Personae (Chicago: University of Chicago Press) 
 2018: Lost Empress (Pantheon)

 Articles and essays
 2010: "A Day's Sail", published by Triple Canopy

Notes

Living people
People from New Jersey
1970s births
Public defenders
American male writers
Brooklyn Law School alumni